Sunday Jones are a pop rock band/songwriting and production team/sync artists from Liverpool, UK. Their songs are featured in film and TV.

Selected Song Syncs

TV 
Heartland 

Being Erica

Six

Film 
The Marine 3: Homefront 

The One

Forgetting The Girl

Wet Behind the Ears

References

External links

English pop music groups
English rock music groups
English indie rock groups
Sibling musical duos
Musical groups from Liverpool
Musical groups established in 2009
English musical duos
Rock music duos
Male musical duos